Woodrow Township is the name of some places in the U.S. state of Minnesota:
Woodrow Township, Beltrami County, Minnesota
Woodrow Township, Cass County, Minnesota

Minnesota township disambiguation pages